Peter Bezencenet (1914–2003) was a British film editor and film director. He co-scripted the 1936 film Conquest of the Air. He was employed by the Rank Organisation on a number of films during the 1950s, including several for Ealing Studios. He also acted as location director for the television series Richard the Lionheart in the early 1960s. During the 1960s he directed four films and episodes of the TV series The Pursuers.

Selected filmography
 Conquest of the Air (1936)
 Floodtide (1949)
 Poet's Pub (1949)
 Intimate Relations (1953)
 The Square Ring (1953)
 The Divided Heart (1954)
 West of Zanzibar (1954)
 The Ship That Died of Shame (1955)
 The Feminine Touch (1956)
 Dangerous Exile (1957)
 The Secret Place (1957)
 Rooney (1958)
 Floods of Fear (1958)
 Jack the Ripper (1959)
 Tommy the Toreador (1959)
 The Siege of Sidney Street (1960)
 Jungle Street (1961)
 Dangerous Afternoon (1961)
 Band of Thieves (1962)
 Hair of the Dog (1962)
 Bomb in the High Street (1963)
 24 Hours to Kill (1965)
 City of Fear (1965)

References

Bibliography
 Burton, Alan  & O'Sullivan, Tim. The Cinema of Basil Dearden and Michael Relph. Edinburgh University Press, 2009.
 Morley, Margaret. The Films of Laurence Olivier. Citadel Press, 1978.

External links

1914 births
2003 deaths
People from Rochford
British film editors
British film directors